Jin Min-sub (born 2 September 1992) is a South Korean athlete specialising in the pole vault. His first major medal was the gold at the 2009 World Youth Championships. He later competed at the 2013 World Championships without qualifying for the final and won the bronze at the 2014 Asian Games.

His personal bests in the event are 5.8 metres outdoors (Sydney 2020) and 5.46 metres indoors (Tsaotun 2014).

Competition record

References

South Korean male pole vaulters
1992 births
Living people
Athletes (track and field) at the 2014 Asian Games
Athletes (track and field) at the 2018 Asian Games
World Athletics Championships athletes for South Korea
Asian Games medalists in athletics (track and field)
Asian Games bronze medalists for South Korea
Medalists at the 2014 Asian Games
Athletes (track and field) at the 2020 Summer Olympics
Olympic athletes of South Korea
Sportspeople from Busan
21st-century South Korean people